Liam Justin Messam (born 25 March 1984) is a New Zealand rugby union player who plays TOP14 for RC Toulonnais. Messam predominantly plays as a blindside flanker but can fill in at Number 8 as well as openside flanker. After the retirement of then Chiefs captain Mils Muliaina, Messam was named the team's new co-captain from 2012 onwards, alongside Aaron Cruden.

National team
In October 2008, Messam was selected in New Zealand's end of year tour squad to tour Hong Kong and Europe. He played one test against Scotland and one match against Munster. He subsequently appeared several more times for New Zealand but was dropped a month out of the 2011 Rugby World Cup in favour of Victor Vito. Since his debut in 2008 he won 40 test caps for the All Blacks.

In 2004, at the age of just 20, he captained the New Zealand sevens team to its fifth IRB Sevens World Series title and in 2005 led the team to the final. Messam also played in the New Zealand sevens teams that won gold at the 2006 Commonwealth Games and 2010 Commonwealth Games. In 2004 he was also named New Zealand Sevens Player of the Year.

Maori
Of Māori descent, Messam affiliates to the Ngāi Tūhoe iwi. Messam has stated that he also has Samoan and Scottish heritage. He has played for the New Zealand Maori, including during the 2006 Churchill Cup and the 2010 centenary series, where he captained the side. In 2012 and 2013 Messam was awarded the Tom French Cup as Māori Player of the Year.

On 31 January 2015, Messam fought on the undercard of close friend Sonny Bill Williams' boxing bout.

2015–present
Messam was selected for the 2015 Rugby World Cup as part of the All Blacks' 31-man squad. After the tournament was finished, Messam announced his intention to compete in rugby sevens for the 2016 Summer Olympics. Messam was later named in the All Black Sevens' squad for the Wellington Sevens alongside All Blacks teammate Sonny Bill Williams.
After the Rio 2016 Summer Olympics, Liam Messam did play for the Chiefs in 2016 Super Rugby competition, when injuries greatly affected the loose forwards positions
.

Throughout his professional athlete career Liam developed a preference for natural alternative health options to relieve both physical pain and mental challenges high-profile athletes experience. After witnessing the detrimental effect conventional pain relief and mental health medication has on close friends and family, Liam founded Ora CBD alongside Teddy Stanaway in 2020.

Professional boxing career 
Messam made his professional boxing debut in January 2015 against Rhys Sullivan on a Sonny Bill Williams undercard. Messam won the fight by Unanimous Decision. Messam will return to the ring six years later to fight in a professional fight for charity to raise funds for Tauranga 8-year-old Antonio Pohatu-Barbarich who is being treated for brain cancer. Messam took on Joe Ageli in his return fight in April 2021, winning by unanimous decision. Since returning to professional boxing, he has started training with Hit Fitness HQ under retired professional boxing, Cairo George. In the same camp is Olympic Bronze medalist David Nyika. Messam will return one year later in New Plymouth, taking on Thomas Russell. Messam won his third professional fight by unanimous decision. After one corporate fight for a charity fight night under Fight for Life, Messam will return to the professional ring in July 2022 against Tussi Asafo. Messam will win get his first win by stoppage. In December, Messam will finish his busy 2022 boxing year by taking on Mathew Matich. Messam won the fight by Unanimous Decision.

Record

Personal life 
Liam Messam's brother, Sam Messam, played in the 2008 All Whites side at the 2008 London Olympics.

References

External links
 
 
 
 
 
 

1984 births
New Zealand rugby union players
New Zealand Māori rugby union players
Māori All Blacks players
New Zealand international rugby union players
Chiefs (rugby union) players
Waikato rugby union players
Commonwealth Games gold medallists for New Zealand
Rugby sevens players at the 2006 Commonwealth Games
New Zealand male rugby sevens players
Rugby union flankers
Rugby union number eights
Rugby union players from Blenheim, New Zealand
People educated at Rotorua Boys' High School
Living people
New Zealand international rugby sevens players
Toshiba Brave Lupus Tokyo players
New Zealand expatriate rugby union players
New Zealand expatriate sportspeople in Japan
Expatriate rugby union players in Japan
Commonwealth Games rugby sevens players of New Zealand
Rugby sevens players at the 2010 Commonwealth Games
Ngāi Tūhoe people
Commonwealth Games medallists in rugby sevens
RC Toulonnais players
Medallists at the 2006 Commonwealth Games
Medallists at the 2010 Commonwealth Games